Dreams and Explorations is the fourth album by pianist Don Friedman which was recorded in 1964 and released on the Riverside label.

Reception

AllMusic reviewer Scott Yanow stated: "Overall, this is a fine effort that features the two sides of early Don Friedman."

Track listing 
All compositions by Don Friedman, except as indicated
 "Episodes" – 5:36    
 "Exploration" (Attila Zoller) – 6:21    
 "Park Row" – 5:30    
 "Blizzard" (Zoller) – 5:22    
 "Israel" (John Carisi) – 6:46    
 "Darn That Dream" (Eddie DeLange, Jimmy Van Heusen) – 5:37    
 "You Stepped Out of a Dream" (Nacio Herb Brown, Gus Kahn) – 6:25

Personnel 
Don Friedman – piano
Attila Zoller – guitar
Dick Kniss – bass 
Dick Berk – drums

References 

1964 albums
Don Friedman albums
Riverside Records albums